The 2017–18 Alba Fehérvár is the 69th season of Alba Fehérvár in the highest tier professional basketball league, NB I/A in Hungary.

Team

Current roster

Depth chart

Transfers summer 2017

Tryouts

In

Players
 Ákos Kovács from Atomerőmű SE, Hungarian National Championship
 Kasey Hill from Florida Gators, Southeastern Conference, NCAA
 Chris Horton from Austin Peay Governors, Ohio Valley Conference, NCAA
 Alandise Harris from Louaize Club, Lebanese Basketball League
 DJ Fenner from Nevada Wolf Pack, Mountain West Conference, NCAA
 Trevis Simpson from Hyères-Toulon, LNB Pro A

Coaches
 Ákos Peresztegi-Nagy from David Kornel Basketball Academy (U20)

Out

Players
 James Farr to Élan Chalon, LNB Pro A
 Brandon Taylor to Steaua CSM EximBank Bucharest
 Justin Edwards to Orlandina Basket, Lega Basket Serie A
 Bradford Burgess
 Alhaji Mohammed
 Winston Shepard

Coaches
 Barnabás Blahó to David Kornel Basketball Academy (U20)

Championship
The 2017–18 Nemzeti Bajnokság I/A is the 87th season of the Nemzeti Bajnokság I/A, the highest tier professional basketball league in Hungary.

Regular season

Mid-Season

Playoffs

FIBA Champions League
The 2017–18 Basketball Champions League will be the second season of the Basketball Champions League (BCL), a European professional basketball competition for clubs that was launched by FIBA. The competition will begin on 19 September 2017, with the qualifying rounds, and will conclude on 6 May 2018.

2nd qualifying round
A total of 16 teams are expected to play in the second qualifying round: Eight teams which enter in this round, and the eight winners of the first qualifying round. The first legs will be played on 24 September, and the second legs will be played on 26 September 2017.

3rd qualifying round
A total of 16 teams are expected to play in the third qualifying round: Eight teams which enter in this round, and the eight winners of the second qualifying round. The first legs will be played on 29 September, and the second legs will be played on 2 October 2017.

Hungarian Cup

Quarterfinals

Semifinals

Final

References

External links
 Official website 

Basketball teams in Hungary
2017–18 in Hungarian basketball